The black-capped tyrannulet (Phyllomyias nigrocapillus) is a species of bird in the family Tyrannidae. It is found in Colombia, Ecuador, Peru, and Venezuela. Its natural habitat is subtropical or tropical moist montane forests.

References

black-capped tyrannulet
Birds of the Northern Andes
black-capped tyrannulet
Taxonomy articles created by Polbot